Martin Borg (born 21 February 1977) is a Swedish former professional basketball player who played as a point guard. Best remembered for his time with the Solna Vikings, he was considered a three-point specialist and helped the team win the 2002–03 Swedish Basketball League. A full international between 1998 and 1999, he appeared 11 times for the Sweden national basketball team.

Career statistics

International

Honours 
Solna Vikings

 Swedish Basketball League: 2002–03

References 

1977 births
Living people
Swedish men's basketball players
Solna Vikings players
Point guards
Basketball players